Kendall West is a census-designated place and unincorporated community in Miami-Dade County, Florida, west of the Florida Turnpike. The population was 36,536 at the 2020 census.

Geography
It is bordered to the east by Kendale Lakes, to the south by The Hammocks, and to the west and north by farmland or undeveloped land.

Demographics

2020 census

As of the 2020 United States census, there were 36,536 people, 11,474 households, and 9,438 families residing in the CDP.

2000 census
As of the census of 2000, there were 38,034 people, 11,759 households, and 9,807 families residing in the CDP. The racial makeup of the CDP was 83.37% White (15.3% were Non-Hispanic White,) 4.23% African American, 0.19% Native American, 1.48% Asian, 0.03% Pacific Islander, 6.44% from other races, and 4.25% from two or more races. Hispanic or Latino of any race were 79.03% of the population.

There were 11,759 households, out of which 49.5% had children under the age of 18 living with them, 58.8% were married couples living together, 18.5% had a female householder with no husband present, and 16.6% were non-families. 11.8% of all households were made up of individuals, and 2.5% had someone living alone who was 65 years of age or older.  The average household size was 3.23 and the average family size was 3.47.

In the census area, the population was spread out, with 29.2% under the age of 18, 10.2% from 18 to 24, 34.9% from 25 to 44, 18.5% from 45 to 64, and 7.1% who were 65 years of age or older.  The median age was 32 years. For every 100 females, there were 89.7 males.  For every 100 females age 18 and over, there were 84.7 males.

The median income for a household in the community was $38,715, and the median income for a family was $39,564. Males had a median income of $30,082 versus $23,695 for females. The per capita income for the CDP was $14,806.  About 13.3% of families and 15.4% of the population were below the poverty line, including 18.4% of those under age 18 and 13.4% of those age 65 or over.

As of 2000, speakers of Spanish as a first language accounted for 84.44% of residents, while English made up 13.48%, and both French Creole and Portuguese were the mother tongue for 0.47% of the population.

Education
Miami-Dade County Public Schools operates public schools.
 Bowman Ashe/Doolin K-8 Academy
 Jane S. Roberts K-8 Center
 Dante B. Fascell Elementary School

Charter schools:
 Pinecrest Academy (South Campus)

See also 
 West Kendall, Florida, a neighborhood within the census boundaries of Kendall

References

Census-designated places in Miami-Dade County, Florida
Unincorporated communities in Miami-Dade County, Florida
Census-designated places in Florida
Unincorporated communities in Florida